Knuckle Sandwich  may refer to:

Arts, entertainment, and media

Music
"Knuckle Sandwich", from Ghetto Pop Life by Danger Mouse and Jemini
"Knuckle Sandwich Nancy", from Till Deaf Do Us Part by Slade
"Knuckle's Sandwich", by Gargamel!
KnuckleSandwich Records, belonging to Scott H. Biram

Other uses in arts, entertainment, and media
 Knuckle Sandwich (video game), an indie role-playing video game in development
Knuckle Sandwich, a 2004 film starring Morgan Fairchild and Eric Stonestreet

Other uses
Knuckle sandwich, an idiom for a punch in the mouth
Knuckle Sandwich, the most popular beer brewed by Bootlegger's Brewery in Fullerton, California